American gospel and R&B singer-songwriter Michelle Williams has released four studio albums, one compilation album and ten singles. 

Williams' began her career in 1999 as a backing vocalist for Grammy Award-winning R&B recording artist Monica and in 2000 a member of one of the best-selling American bands of all time, Destiny's Child, who have sold approximately 60 million records worldwide. She released her first solo album Heart to Yours (2002), during the hiatus of Destiny's Child, making her the first member of the band to do so. The album topped the US Gospel Albums chart, and peaked at number eleven on the Top R&B/Hip-Hop Albums chart and fifty seven on the Billboard 200. The album won Williams an award for "Best Gospel Act" at the 2002 MOBO Awards and spawned the single "Heard a Word" which was featured on the platinum-certified WOW Gospel 2003 compilation album. As of 2008, Heart to Yours has sold over 220,000 copies in the US.

In 2004, after making her on-stage acting debut the previous year in the Broadway musical Aida, Williams released her second studio album Do You Know which  peaked at number two on the Gospel Albums chart, number three on the Christian Albums chart and number twenty-eight on the Top R&B/Hip-Hop Albums chart. Do You Know gained Williams a nomination for "Best Gospel Act" at the 2004 MOBO Awards and spawned a same-titled single which was included on Live in Atlanta. As of 2008, Do You Know has sold over 78,000 copies in the US.

Williams' third album and pop debut Unexpected (2008) debuted at number forty-two and eleven on the Billboard 200 and Top R&B/Hip-Hop Albums charts respectively. Unexpected also spawned the singles "We Break the Dawn", which topped the US Hot Dance Airplay chart and was a moderate top 50 success in the UK and Hungary; "The Greatest", which topped the US Dance chart; and "Hello Heartbreak". "The Greatest" is ranked number thirty-nine on the US Billboard Dance Club Songs decade-end (2000-2009) chart. As of 2013, Unexpected has sold over 34,000 copies in the US. In 2011, Williams gained her third top 20 hit on the US Dance chart when Ultra Naté released a joint collaboration with her titled "Waiting on You", which peaked at number eleven.

In 2014, Williams released her fourth studio album Journey to Freedom which debuted at number twenty-nine on the Billboard 200 and became her second number two debut on US Gospel Albums; featuring the singles "If We Had Your Eyes", which reached the top 20 of the US Adult R&B Songs chart; "Fire" and ""Say Yes", which topped the US Hot Gospel Songs chart for seven weeks. "Say Yes" also appeared on the Billboard Hot Gospel Songs year-end charts for two consecutive years, at number seven and twenty-three in 2014 and 2015, respectively. In 2019, Billboard ranked "Say Yes" number fifty on the decade-end (2010-2019) Hot Gospel Songs chart.

Albums

Studio albums

Compilation albums

Karaoke albums

Singles

As a lead artist

As a featured artist

Soundtrack and promotional singles

Other charted songs

Album appearances

Soundtrack appearances

Songwriting discography

Videography

Music videos

Notes

See also
 List of artists who reached number one on the U.S. Dance Club Songs chart
 Destiny's Child discography

References

External links

Michelle Williams on Myspace

Discographies of American artists
Rhythm and blues discographies
Christian music discographies
Soul music discographies